Gazprom-Media is the largest Russian media holding. Gazprom-Media was established in January 1998 as a subsidiary of the 1997 established Gazprom Media Holdings. On its founding in 1997, Gazprom Media Holdings was a subsidiary of Gazprom, a large Russian company founded in 1989, which carries on the business of extraction, production, transport, and sale of natural gas.

The group owns more than 38 television channels and 10 radio stations.

History

After Gazprom-Media took over "Media Most" in 2000, Gazprom-Media received Filipp Bobkov's entire former KGB 5th directorate (Political police) including all of its employees which was in the thousands, its database and the Bobkov founded security service that was accused of attempting an assassination in 1994 of Boris Berezovsky. The entire archive of 5th KGB Main Directorate was taken to Media-Most. In 2000, Bobkov created the Institute for Strategic Assessments and Analysis (ISOA), a joint stock company (JSC), as a think tank successor to "Media Most"'s security department with the former head of KGB in Azerbaijan  (b. born November 27, 1942 Quba, Azerbaijan) the director of ISOA and from 2001 to 2002  was chairman of the board.

In 2005, Gazprom-Media purchased Izvestia, a leading nationwide newspaper. In May 2008, Sergei Fursenko's  gained a 50.1% stake in Izvestia.

For 37.22 billion rubles in August 2005, Gazprom-Media Holdings was sold to Gazprombank which in 2012 OJSC Gazprom owned a 41.73% stake in Gazprombank and NPF Gazfond owned a 46.92% stake in Gazprom. As of 2012, most of the stake in Yuri Shamalov's associated Gazfond is managed by Anatoly Gavrilenko's  a management company which is part of the SOGAZ insurance group which is controlled by the Vladimir Putin associated Rossiya Bank which has Yuri Kovalchuk as its largest shareholder. In March 2014, Rossiya Bank sold its indirect control of Lider to Gasfond which owns a 45% stake in Lider. As of November 2014, Gasfond is the largest shareholder in Gazprombank which controls Gazprom-Media.

Media assets

Television
 2×2
 365 Days TV
 Pyatnitsa!
 Match!
 NTV
 NTV Plus
 TNT
 TNT4
 TV-3

Radio
AvtoRadio
CITY-FM
Comedy radio
Ekho Moskvy
Europa Plus
Humor FM
Kids Radio
Like FM
NRJ Russia
Relax FM
Romantica

Paper publications
Seven Days Publishing House
Seven Days (TV guide)
Story Caravan (monthly magazine)
Story Caravan Collection (monthly magazine)

Internet
Rutube
 Вокруг ТВ
 SRSLY
 Sportbox.ru
 УМА-ТЕХ
 Premier
 Getintent
 2x2.Медиа

Movie and cinema
Central Partnership
Comedy Club Production
 Red Media
NTV-Kino
October Cinema & Crystal Palace Cinema

Directors General
 Viktor Ilyushin (December 1997 – June 1998)
 Sergey Zverev (June 1998 – May 1999)
 Alexander Astafyev (1999 – 2000)
 Alfred Kokh (June 2000 – October 2001)
 Boris Jordan (October 2001 – January 2003)
 Alexander Dybal (January 2003 – June 2004)
 Nikolay Senkevich (since July 2004)
 Aleksandr Zharov (since March 2020)

Board of directors
Alexey Miller (chairman)
Aleksandr Zharov
Yuri Shamalov
Alaxey Matveev
Sergey Kupriyanov
Sergey Kuznets

Management
Aleksandr Zharov (CEO, Member of the Board of Directors)
Svetlana Fefilova (Deputy CEO)
Yulia Golubeva (Deputy CEO)
Tina Kandelaki (Deputy CEO)

See also
Michael R. Caputo

Notes

References

External links
Official site  (archived)

Mass media companies of Russia
Companies based in Moscow
Gazprom subsidiaries
Mass media companies established in 2000
Television in Russia
Russian companies established in 2000